Dafydd Howells (born 22 March 1995) is a Wales international rugby union player. A wing, he plays for the Dragons regional team having previously played for Ospreys and Neath RFC.

International
In May 2013 he was selected in the Wales national rugby union team 32 man training squad for the summer 2013 tour to Japan. He made his international debut against Japan on 8 June 2013

References

Wales international rugby union players
Welsh rugby union players
Ospreys (rugby union) players
Dragons RFC players
1995 births
Living people
Rugby union wings
Rugby union players from Powys
Rugby union players from Brecon